Tang-e Monareh (also Romanized as Tang-e Monāreh) is a village in Kamaraj Rural District, Kamaraj and Konartakhteh District, Kazerun County, Fars Province, Iran. At the 2006 census, its population was 120, in 30 families.

References 

Populated places in Kazerun County